Lycée Robert Schuman is a Catholic private senior high school/sixth-form college in Dugny, Seine-Saint-Denis, France, in the Paris metropolitan area.

Christian engineers established the school in 1920.

References

External links
 Lycée Robert Schuman 

Lycées in Seine-Saint-Denis
Private schools in France